J. Bradley Creed is an American theologian, ordained minister, and academic administrator, currently serving as the fifth president of Campbell University. He took office on July 1, 2015, succeeding Jerry M. Wallace.

Early life and education 
Creed was born and raised in Jacksonville, Texas, where he graduated from Jacksonville High School in 1975. He earned a bachelor of arts in religion from Baylor University in 1979. He went on to earn a Master of Divinity and Ph.D from the Southwestern Baptist Theological Seminary in Fort Worth, where he was a teaching fellow in church history and pastor of Wheatland Baptist Church.

Career 
Creed joined the faculty of Northwestern State University in Natchitoches, Louisiana and accepted the pulpit of the First Baptist Church in 1988. In 1993, he returned to Baylor University as professor of Christian history and was made Dean of the George W. Truett Theological Seminary in 1996. He moved to Samford University in 2001, working as a professor of religion and associate provost. He was promoted to provost in 2002 and selected for honoris causa membership into Omicron Delta Kappa. He was promoted to executive vice president in 2006.

Creed left Samford University in 2015 to become the fifth president of Campbell University.

Personal life 
Creed and his wife, Kathy, have three children: Caitlin, Charles and Carrie Grace.

References

1957 births
Living people
Presidents of Campbell University
Baylor University alumni
People from Jacksonville, Texas
American academic administrators